Aethes promptana is a species of moth of the family Tortricidae. It is found in North America, where it has been recorded from Nova Scotia, Illinois, Maine, Mississippi, Missouri, New Jersey, Ohio, Pennsylvania and Wisconsin.

The ground colour of the forewings is cream with buff-yellow markings with scattered brown scales. The hindwings are drab grey. Adults have been recorded on wing from April to July, suggesting either one or two generations per year.

References

promptana
Moths described in 1869
Moths of North America